The 1980 Harvard Crimson football team was an American football team that represented Harvard University during the 1980 NCAA Division I-A football season. Harvard tied for third place in the Ivy League.

In their tenth year under head coach Joe Restic, the Crimson compiled a 7–3 record and outscored opponents 159 to 138. Charles F. Durst was the team captain.

Harvard's 4–3 conference record tied for third in the Ivy League standings. The Crimson were evenly matched by Ivy opponents, with 106 points scored and 106 points against.

Ivy League football teams expanded their schedules to 10 games in 1980, making this the first year since 1953 that the Crimson played three games against non-Ivy opponents.

Harvard played its home games at Harvard Stadium in the Allston neighborhood of Boston, Massachusetts.

Schedule

References

Harvard
Harvard Crimson football seasons
Harvard Crimson football
Harvard Crimson football